The 2022–2023 mpox outbreak in Colombia is a part of the outbreak of human mpox caused by the West African clade of the monkeypox virus. The outbreak reached Colombia on 23 June 2022.

Background

History

May 2022 
As of May, the Colombian Ministry of Health was taking follow-up and control measures. The Director of Epidemiology and Demography of the Ministry of Health, Claudia Cuellar, informed the Colombian population about how mpox is spread through people, and she spoke about the clinical presentation of the virus and international health regulations. Health authorities in the Department of Norte de Santander have been on alert, since the department is a border area where people pass between Colombia and Venezuela.

June 2022 
On June 23, 2022, the Colombian Ministry of Health confirmed three cases of mpox, specifically two in the city of Bogotá and one in Medellín. The two cases reported in Bogota were of people who had traveled to Europe. The first case identified in Medellin was a person who had been infected while traveling to the European city of Barcelona in Spain.

July 2022 
On July 8, the National Institute of Health confirmed a new case of the disease in Bogota from a person who had been in contact with an infected person from Italy when they had traveled to Europe. On July 23, following the follow-up of several cases, health authorities began an extensive surveillance phase. On the same day, the National Institute of Health confirmed that the number of cases in the country reached 10. On July 25, the first case of a person who had been in Argentina was reported in the department of Cundinamarca, specifically in the municipality of Cajicá. On July 29, the first case was detected in Pereira, capital of the department of Risaralda. On July 30, the National Institute of Health confirmed the first case in the department of Valle del Cauca, specifically in the city of Cartago located in the north of the department.

August 2022 
On August 1st, the Mayor's Office of Cali City opened a hotline to receive information when a person reports suspected cases of this disease. On August 3, the first case was confirmed in the Department of La Guajira of a man who had traveled to Bogotá. The case was detected in the municipality of Albania, which is located in the center of the department. After the first case was detected in La Guajira, health authorities in the neighboring department of Cesar increased their alert. The department's health secretary, Guillermo Girón, indicated that prevention measures should be increased due to the proximity to La Guajira. On August 4, the first case was confirmed in the city of Bucaramanga, capital of the department of Santander. On the same day, the first case was registered in the department of Tolima, specifically in the capital city of Ibagué, of a person who had traveled to the United States. On August 5, the first case was confirmed in the capital of the department of Bolívar, Cartagena. On August 11, the first case of this disease was detected in Popayán, capital of the Cauca department. On August 12, the first case of mpox in Riohacha, capital of La Guajira, was confirmed. On August 15, the first case was confirmed in the city of Cúcuta, capital of the department of Norte de Santander, in a man who had traveled to Mexico and the United States. On the same day, the first case was reported in Barranquilla, capital city of the Atlántico department. On August 16, the first case was reported in Cali, capital city of the Valle del Cauca department. On August 17, the first case was confirmed in the capital of the department of Quindío, Armenia. On August 20, the first case was reported in the city of Villavicencio, capital of the Meta department. On August 31, the José María Córdova airport carried out the first simulation in the country in order to deal with contagions of the disease. On August 26, the first one was confirmed in the department of Sucre, specifically in the municipality of Tolú in the western part of the department. On August 29, the first case was confirmed in Tunja, capital of the department of Boyacá.

September 2022 
On September 7, the health authorities of the department of Cesar confirmed the first case in the department, specifically in Valledupar. On September 9, the first case was confirmed in the capital of Putumayo, Mocoa, according to Adriana Medicis, health secretary of the departmental government, explained that the case was a person residing in Mocoa. Also on the same day, the first case was confirmed in the city of Neiva, the capital of the Huila department.

Vaccination 
In August 2022, the Colombian government requested from the Pan American Health Organization the vaccines to immunize the country's population. Doctor Gina Tambini, who is Colombia's representative for both the World Health Organization and the Pan American Health Organization, explained about the vaccination scheme that will be implemented in the country, which will first prioritize people who have presented symptoms of the disease or have been close to positive cases.

Cumulative Case Progress

Confirmed new cases per day

Recoreved per day

By department

References

External links 

 Disease Information Page from the National Institute of Health (in Spanish)
 Press Release from the Pontifical Javeriana University of Colombia about Monkeypox (in Spanish)

 Press Release from the Government of Risaralda about Monkeypox (in Spanish)

Colombia
Disease outbreaks in Colombia
2022 disasters in Colombia